Fuchs Dome is a large ice-covered dome rising over , between Stratton Glacier and Gordon Glacier in the central part of the Shackleton Range, Antarctica. It was first mapped in 1957 by the Commonwealth Trans-Antarctic Expedition (CTAE) and named for Sir Vivian E. Fuchs, leader of the CTAE 1955–58.

References

Ice caps of Antarctica
Bodies of ice of Coats Land